Qarah Bolagh-e Panjeh (also Romanized as Qarah Bolāgh-e Panjeh and Qareh Bolāgh-e Panjeh; also known as Kareh Bolāgh, Kareh Bowlāgh, Kurreh Bulaq, Qara Bolāgh-e Panjeh, Qara Bulāq, Qarah Bowlāgh, and Qareh Bowlāgh) is a village in Panjeh Ali-ye Jonubi Rural District, in the Central District of Qorveh County, Kurdistan Province, Iran. As of the  2006 census, its population was 539, with 114 families. The village is populated by Kurds.

References 

Towns and villages in Qorveh County
Kurdish settlements in Kurdistan Province